Sultan Salahuddin Abdul Aziz Building is Selangor's state secretariat building.  It is located at Bukit SUK, Section 5, Shah Alam, Selangor, Malaysia. It was constructed between 1982 and 1984. The building was officially opened on 2 February 1985 by Almarhum Sultan Salahuddin Abdul Aziz Shah of Selangor. It houses the machineries of the state government, including Menteri Besar's office, State Assembly Hall and Silver Jubilee Hall.

Architecture
The building is constructed with elements of traditional Bugis design. It shapes like a cargo ship, which signifies the progress of Selangor to a developed state.

References

State secretariat buildings in Malaysia
Buildings and structures in Selangor
Shah Alam
Selangor State Legislative Assembly